Concepción Bona is a Santo Domingo Metro station on Line 2. It was open on 9 August 2018 as part of the section of Line 2 between Eduardo Brito and Concepción Bona. It is currently the eastern terminus of the line. The adjacent station is Trina de Moya de Vasquez.

This is an underground station built below Avenida San Vicente de Paúl. It is named in honor of Concepción Bona.

References

Santo Domingo Metro stations
2018 establishments in the Dominican Republic
Railway stations opened in 2018